The Baptes (Greek βάπτης) were priests of the Greek goddess Kotys.  The word comes from the Greek verb βάπτω (baptō), meaning "to dip in water".  The Baptes practised nocturnal ceremonies, which were associated with rampant obscenity and insobriety.

See also
List of Greek mythological figures

Notes

This article incorporates text from Brewer's Dictionary of Phrase and Fable by E. Cobham Brewer (1894), a publication now in the public domain.

Greek mythology

Characters in Greek mythology